Chainsaw is a java-based GUI software tool to view and analyze computer log files - specifically logs generated by the Log4j logging system. Both Log4j and Chainsaw are Open source projects under Apache Software Foundation. The latest release is Chainsaw v2. Chainsaw can read log files formatted in Log4j's XMLLayout, receive events from remote locations, read events from a DB, or work with JDK 1.4 logging events.

License
The project is licensed under Apache License, V 2.0. Dependencies may not follow the same licensing.

Alternatives

Open Source License
 glogg
 Lilith
 LogExpert
 OtrosLogViewer
 Logbert

Commercial License
 BareTail
 LogMX
 LogViewPlus
 ReflectInsight Log Viewer

References

External links 
 Apache Logging Services Chainsaw v2 Home
 JavaDoc API reference for Chainsaw v2

Apache Software Foundation
Java (programming language)